The Dassault Falcon 10X is a large, long-range business jet under development by Dassault Aviation in France.

Development 
On 6 May 2021, Dassault launched its $75 million Falcon 10X flagship, scheduled for 2025, to compete with the Bombardier Global 7500 and the Gulfstream G700.

Design 
It is powered by two Rolls-Royce Pearl 10X engines with over  thrust, with a titanium fan blisk, a 10-stage  compressor, a two-stage shroudless HP turbine and a four-stage  turbine.

It should cruise at Mach 0.85-0.925 with a range of 7,500 nmi (13,900 km), and should access steep approaches like London City airport.

With sidesticks and a single throttle lever, the fly-by-wire flight control system has flightpath stability to avoid trimming, and head-up display-based FalconEye combined vision system.
High automation with automated return to straight and level flight, emergency descent, reduced take-off thrust and noise abatement modes could allow two pilots to fly for 15h instead of three currently.

See also

Specifications

References

External links
 

Falcon 10X
Proposed aircraft of France
Low-wing aircraft
Twinjets
T-tail aircraft